Sveinn Ingvarsson (2 July 1914 – 22 January 2009) was an Icelandic sprinter. He competed in the men's 100 metres at the 1936 Summer Olympics.

References

1914 births
2009 deaths
Athletes (track and field) at the 1936 Summer Olympics
Sveinn Ingvarsson
Sveinn Ingvarsson
Place of birth missing